The Western Australian Government Railways (WAGR) O Class was a class consisting of fifty-six 2-8-0 steam locomotives which were  introduced by the WAGR between 1896 and 1912. Despite them being tender locomotives, they also featured short boiler side tanks for additional water storage. A useful feature for the long distances required by operation on Western Australia's country lines.

History
Between 1896 and 1898, the WAGR took delivery of 36 O class locomotives from Neilson & Co with a further 10 built by Dübs & Co. They initially operated services on the Eastern Railway and on the South Western Railway to Collie before being superseded by the Ec and K classes and moving to branch line duties. In 1907/08, 10 O class were rebuilt as N Class suburban tank engines.

Between 1909 and 1912, Midland Railway Workshops built a further 10 as the Oa class. The last examples of the O class were withdrawn from service in 1962.

O218 has been preserved at the Western Australian Rail Transport Museum. In April 2015, it moved to the Walkaway Station Museum on a five-year loan.

References

Dübs locomotives
Railway locomotives introduced in 1896
O WAGR class
2-8-0 locomotives
3 ft 6 in gauge locomotives of Australia
Freight locomotives